Papatowai is a small settlement in the Catlins ward of the Clutha District of the southeastern South Island of New Zealand.  The settlement is situated half-way between the cities of Dunedin and Invercargill, on the Pacific coast close to the mouth of the Tahakopa River.  There is a permanent population of around 40 people but with most of the houses in the town being holiday homes (locally known as "cribs") the population rises dramatically during the holiday seasons, particularly around New Year's Day and Easter.

Papatowai is surrounded by native podocarp forest and there are numerous walks in the area to waterfalls, and sand beaches in addition to bushwalks.  There is also a walk to an archaeological site where it is possible to see middens left by early Māori inhabitants of the area. In the past, the bones of moa have also been found here.

In addition to its outstanding unspoilt nature beauty, Papatowai is renowned for the quirky Lost Gypsy Gallery

The Papatowai Challenge, a 15.5 km bush and beach run and walk, has been held annually since 1998, usually on the first weekend in March. It attracts 300 – 400 people each year.

Papatowai is also known for its big wave surfing.

References

Populated places in Otago
The Catlins
Beaches of Otago
Surfing locations in New Zealand
Clutha District